Tavern Club may refer to:

Tavern Club (Boston, Massachusetts), a private club
Tavern Club (Cleveland, Ohio), listed on the National Register of Historic Places
Tavern Club, a social club that was on Michigan Avenue in Chicago